Mianeh County (also Miyaneh County) is in East Azerbaijan province, Iran. The capital of the county is the city of Mianeh. At the 2006 census, the county's population was 187,870 in 46,469 households. The following census in 2011 counted 185,806 people in 52,630 households. At the 2016 census, the county's population was 182,848 in 57,665 households. The city of Torkamanchay is where the Treaty of Turkmenchay was signed by Russia and Iran in 1828.

Administrative divisions

The population history and structural changes of Mianeh County's administrative divisions over three consecutive censuses are shown in the following table. The latest census shows four districts, 17 rural districts, and five cities.

References

Mianeh County| 

Counties of East Azerbaijan Province